William Fagerbakke (born October 4, 1957) is an American actor. He voices Patrick Star in the animated series SpongeBob SquarePants and played Michael "Dauber" Dybinski on the sitcom Coach. He also appeared in 12 episodes of the sitcom How I Met Your Mother as Marshall Eriksen's father Marvin.

Early life and education
Fagerbakke was born on October 4, 1957, in Fontana, California, and moved to Rupert, Idaho, as a youth. He graduated from Minico High School in Rupert in 1975, where he was a three-sport athlete for the Spartans in football, basketball, and track.

Although he had multiple scholarship offers for college football, including Pac-8 schools, he decided to stay in state and attended the University of Idaho in Moscow. He was a defensive lineman for the Vandals and was ticketed to redshirt in 1976, but was called into action in the fourth game of his sophomore season. The Vandals went 7–4 in 1976, their first winning season in five years, and were 5–2 in the seven games that Fagerbakke started. Head coach Ed Troxel planned on moving him to the offensive line in 1977, but a knee injury in spring drills ended Fagerbakke's athletic career, which turned his focus to theater (the Vandals went 3–8 in 1977 and Troxel was fired; then 2–9 in 1978 under Jerry Davitch, one of the wins being a "no-show" forfeit).

Fagerbakke's first theatrical role was in a campus production of Godspell. He was a member of the Delta Tau Delta fraternity and earned his bachelor's degree in 1981, a result of "two years of football and four years of school." He later attended graduate school at Southern Methodist University in Dallas, Texas.

Career

Fagerbakke has appeared on television in roles such as assistant coach "Dauber" Dybinski on Coach, and in movies, including Funny Farm. He had a role as the mentally disabled Tom Cullen in the 1994 mini-series Stephen King's The Stand.  In 1999, he had a role in HBO's original series Oz as Officer Karl Metzger. Since 1999, he has provided the voice of Patrick Star for the Nicktoon SpongeBob SquarePants. His character on Coach was based on a former assistant coach at Idaho, a graduate assistant nicknamed "Tuna."

In 2007, he made a cameo appearance on the show Heroes as Steve Gustavson in the episodes "Run" and "Unexpected."  In 2009, he had a role in the film Jennifer's Body. He also played the role of Marvin Eriksen Sr. in the CBS sitcom How I Met Your Mother. In 2012, he made a cameo appearance in the TV show Weeds.

In 2022, Fagerbakke guest-starred in season 5 of Dynasty portraying Peter De Vilbes while his daughter Carson portrays Peter's daughter Patty.

Personal life
Fagerbakke married actress Catherine McClenahan in 1989, together they have two daughters. In September 2012, he filed for legal separation from McClenahan, citing irreconcilable differences.

Filmography

Television voice roles

Video games

Television live action roles

 Coach (1989–1997) (TV Series)
 Stephen King's The Stand (1994) (TV Series) - Tom Cullen
 Sabrina the Teenage Witch (1996) (TV Series) - Dirk
 Oz (TV Series) (1998–1999) - Karl Metzger
 Roughnecks: The Starship Troopers Chronicles (Animated TV series) - Sgt. Gossard (1999)
 Dragon Tales (1999–2005) (TV series) (Additional Voices)
 The Grim Adventures of Billy and Mandy (TV Series) - Thud
 Lloyd in Space (2001)  (voice) (TV series) - Kurt Blobberts
 Jackie Chan Adventures (2001) (voice) - Butch
 Jimmy Neutron's Nicktoon Blast (2003) (voice) - Patrick Star
 SpongeBob SquarePants B.C. (Before Comedy) (2004) - Patar (Caveman version of Patrick Star), Caveman
 How I Met Your Mother (2005–2014) - Marvin Eriksen Sr.
 A.T.O.M. (2005–2006) - Albert "Flesh"
 Family Guy (2007) (voice) - Patrick Star (archive footage from The Campfire Episode; uncredited) - Road to Rupert
 Kim Possible (2007) (voice) - Myron
 According To Jim (2007) (TV Series) - Howard
 Shrieking Violet (2007) - Larchmont
 Phineas and Ferb (2009) - Frosty the Snowman
Handy Manny (2010) - Roland
Weeds (2012) - Police Academy Instructor
Robot and Monster (2012) - Lev Krumholtz
Growing Up Fisher (2014) - Ken Fisher
Crash & Bernstein (2014) - Jeff
Black-ish (2017) - Tom Avery
Mom (2018) - Sergeant Gene Rubenzer
I'm Dying Up Here (2018) - Chris Beverly
Young Sheldon (2021) - Officer Jake
Dynasty (2022) - Peter De Vilbes

Films

 Perfect Strangers (1984)
 Almost Partners (1987)
 The Secret of My Success (1987)
 Funny Farm (1988)
 Loose Cannons (1990)
 3×3 Eyes (1991)
 Porco Rosso (1992)
 Playtoons (1994) (Additional Voices) - FLOOBS
 The Hunchback of Notre Dame (1996) (voice) - Oafish Guard
 Under Wraps (1997) - Harold/Ted
 The Ultimate Christmas Present (2000) - Sparky
 Lady and the Tramp II: Scamp's Adventure (2001) (voice) - Mooch
 Ken Park (2002)
 Final Fantasy: Unlimited (2002) (voice) - Fungus (in some episodes)
 Patrick the Snowman (SpongeBob SquarePants and Jimmy Neutron crossover short) (2002) (voice) - Patrick Star
 Quigley (2003)
 Balto III: Wings of Change (2004) (voice) - Ralph, Mr. Conner
 The SpongeBob SquarePants Movie (2004) (voice) - Patrick Star
 Callback (2005)
 The Madagascar Penguins in a Christmas Caper (2005) (voice) - Ted the Polar Bear
 The Legend of Frosty the Snowman (2005) (voice) - Frosty the Snowman
 The Endless Summer (SpongeBob SquarePants short) (2005) (voice) - Patrick Star
 Finding Amanda (2008) - Larry
 Space Buddies (2009) - Pi
 Halloween II (2009) - Deputy Webb
 Jennifer's Body (2009) - Jonas' Dad
 The Artist (2011) - Policeman
 Rosewood Lane (2011) - Hank Hawthorne
 The Babymakers (2012) - Clark
 SpongeBob SquarePants 4D: The Great Jelly Rescue (2013) - Patrick Star
 The SpongeBob Movie: Sponge Out of Water (2015) - Patrick Star
 All In with Cam Newton (2016) - Himself
 All Hail King Julien: Exiled (2017) - Hans, Hans Army
 The SpongeBob Movie: Sponge on the Run (2021) - Patrick Star

Accolades

References

External links 

 
 
 
 
 

Male actors from California
Male actors from Idaho
American male film actors
American male musical theatre actors
American male television actors
American male voice actors
Idaho Vandals football players
Living people
University of Idaho alumni
Southern Methodist University alumni
American male video game actors
People from Fontana, California
People from Rupert, Idaho
1957 births
20th-century American male actors
21st-century American male actors